Parc Central is a park in Andorra la Vella, Andorra. It was designed by the architect Daniel Gelabert Fontova.

References

Geography of Andorra la Vella
Parks in Andorra